Ali Amr Farag (born 22 April 1992) is an Egyptian professional squash player. He is the 2018–19, 2020–21 and 2021–22 World Champion, and is currently ranked as world No. 3  

by the Professional Squash Association (PSA).

Education
Farag graduated from Harvard University in 2014 with a degree in Mechanical Engineering.

Farag also graduated as one of the best squash players in college history, suffering only two defeats in his three years. As a member of Harvard's Varsity Squash Team, Farag won two individual national titles and helped lead Harvard to its first team title in 17 years in 2014.

Professional career
After graduating, Farag returned to the pro circuit where he has since begun a rapid climb up the world rankings. He was named the PSA Player of the Month in April 2015 for reaching the main draw of the El Gouna Invitational as a qualifier and for winning back-to-back titles in Ireland. Farag eventually established himself as one of the best in the game.

Farag won his first world title in 2019 beating Tarek Momen in the final continuing the recent Egyptian domination of the sport. He reached the final of 2019 British Open championship but was defeated by his fellow Egyptian Mohamed El Shorbagy. In 2021, he again reached to the final of 2021 British Open championship but this time he was defeated by New Zealand's Paul Coll.

Personal life
He is married to fellow squash professional Nour El Tayeb and the pair set a new record becoming the first married couple to both win the same major title on the same day after winning the US Open in 2017. The couple came close to repeating the same record in the 2019 US Open, but Tayeb lost her final in a narrow 5-game thriller.

References

External links 

Egyptian male squash players
Harvard Crimson men's squash players
Living people
1992 births
Harvard School of Engineering and Applied Sciences alumni
21st-century Egyptian people